Ripiphorinae is a subfamily of wedge-shaped beetles in the family Ripiphoridae. There are at least 2 genera and 40 described species in Ripiphorinae.

Genera
These two genera belong to the subfamily Ripiphorinae:
 Macrosiagon Hentz, 1830 i c g b
 Ripiphorus Bosc, 1791 i c g b
Data sources: i = ITIS, c = Catalogue of Life, g = GBIF, b = Bugguide.net

References

Further reading

External links

 

Tenebrionoidea